Events from the year 1658 in England.

Incumbents
 Lord Protector – Oliver Cromwell (until 3 September), Richard Cromwell (starting 3 September)
 Parliament – Second Protectorate (until 4 February)

Events
 4 February – Oliver Cromwell dissolves the Second Protectorate Parliament.
 April – first stage coach services advertised; 4-day trips from London to Exeter, York, and Chester.
 14 June – Anglo-Spanish War: A French and English army defeats the Spanish the Battle of the Dunes.
 30 August – hurricane storms in southern England; the worst for centuries.
 3 September – Richard Cromwell becomes Lord Protector on the death of his father Oliver.
 October
 Savoy Declaration, A Declaration of the Faith and Order owned and practised in the Congregational Churches in England, is drawn up by Independents and Congregationalists meeting at the Savoy Hospital, London.
 First domestic pendulum clocks advertised for sale in England, by Ahasuerus Fromanteel of London.

Undated
 Tea first arrives in England, exported from China via Holland.

Ongoing events
 Anglo-Spanish War 1654–1660

Publications
 Thomas Browne – Hydriotaphia, Urn Burial and The Garden of Cyrus
 The Whole Duty of Man

Births
 5 May (bapt.) – Thomas Bray, clergyman (died 1730)
 3 July – Hester Pinney, businesswoman (died 1740)
 16 August – Ralph Thoresby, historian (died 1724)
 16 September – John Dennis, dramatist and critic (died 1734)
 5 October – Mary of Modena, queen of King James II (died 1718)
 10 December – Lancelot Blackburne, clergyman (died 1743)
 approximate date
 Elizabeth Barry, actress (died 1713)
 Theodore Janssen, Member of Parliament and financier (died 1748)
 Charles Mordaunt, 3rd Earl of Peterborough, military leader (died 1735)

Deaths
 7 January – Theophilus Eaton, colonial leader (born 1590)
 13 January – Edward Sexby, Puritan soldier (born 1616)
 19 April – Robert Rich, 2nd Earl of Warwick, Admiral (born 1587)
 29 April – John Cleveland, poet (born 1613)
 2 August (bur.) – Humphrey Edwards, regicide of Charles I (born 1582)
 10 August – George Harding, 8th Baron Berkeley, noble (born 1601)
 3 September – Oliver Cromwell, Lord Protector (born 1599)
 September – Lucy Walter, royal mistress, in France (born c.1630 in Wales)
 Sir John Fenwick, 1st Baronet, Royalist (born c. 1570)
 Sir Richard Grenville, 1st Baronet, Royalist exile (born 1600)
 Robert Walker, portrait painter (born 1599)

References

 
Years of the 17th century in England